Rhodometra is a genus of moths in the family Geometridae erected by Edward Meyrick in 1892.

These moths have bipectinated antennae for the males; apically simple. They have relatively narrow-elongated to relatively broad forewings and a wingspan of 20–30 mm. The forewings are pale yellow, sometimes rosy and traversed by an oblique red stripe, the hindwings are plain.

Species
Species include:

 Rhodometra albidaria Erschoff, 1874
 Rhodometra albipunctaria Dognin, 1917
 Rhodometra angasmarcata Hübner, 1822
 Rhodometra anthophilaria Hübner, 1809/13
 Rhodometra aucta Krausse, 1913
 Rhodometra audeoudi Prout, 1928
 Rhodometra consecraria (Boisduval, 1840)
 Rhodometra debiliaria Rothschild, 1914
 Rhodometra desertorum Staudinger, 1914
 Rhodometra elvira Thierry-Mieg, 1911
 Rhodometra excaecaria Fuchs, 1903
 Rhodometra fumosa Prout, 1937
 Rhodometra gegenaria Alphéraky, 1883
 Rhodometra incarnaria Thierry-Mieg, 1911
 Rhodometra intermediaria Turati, 1930
 Rhodometra intervenata Warren, 1902
 Rhodometra kikiae Wiltshire, 1982
 Rhodometra labdoides Herbulot, 1997
 Rhodometra lucidaria (C. Swinhoe, 1904)
 Rhodometra paralellaria Krüger, 1934
 Rhodometra participata (Walker, 1862)
 Rhodometra plectaria (Guenée, 1858)
 Rhodometra rosearia Treitschke, 1828
 Rhodometra roseata Dognin, 1917
 Rhodometra roseofimbriata Thierry-Mieg, 1911
 Rhodometra sacraria Linnaeus, 1767
 Rhodometra satura Prout, 1916
 Rhodometra sevastopuloi Carcasson, 1964
 Rhodometra subrosearia Staudinger, 1871
 Rhodometra subsacraria Staudinger, 1871
 Rhodometra virgenpamba Dognin, 1892

References

Rhodometrini